Virginia Dodd Smith (June 30, 1911 – January 23, 2006) was a Republican member of the United States House of Representatives from 1975 to 1991 from the Third Congressional District of Nebraska. She was first and to date only woman from Nebraska to hold a seat in the House.

Before serving in Congress, Smith chaired the American Farm Bureau Women for twenty years.

Congress
Smith was elected to succeed Representative Dave Martin in 1974. In the year of Watergate, she defeated her Democratic opponent Wayne Ziebarth by just 737 votes. However, she never faced another contest anywhere near that close, and was reelected seven more times from what has long been one of the most Republican districts in the nation. Proving just how Republican this district was, her lowest vote share apart from her initial bid was 69 percent in 1986, and she even ran unopposed in 1982.

Death
She died in 2006 in Sun City West, Arizona at the age of 94. She is buried in Iowa alongside her husband, Haven, who died in 1997.

See also
 Women in the United States House of Representatives

References

 Dan Balz. "Indiana Democrat Wins House Panel's Support." 04/24/1985. Washington Post. p. A4.
 Judith Havemann. "2 in GOP Try to Block Pay Raise for Congress." Washington Post. 01/07/1987. p. A14.
 George C. Wilson. "Funding for MX Survives on Tied Committee Vote." Washington Post. 12/03/1982. p. A1.
 Entry in the Biographical Dictionary of Congress
 U.S. House of Representatives. Office of the Clerk. Election Statistics.
 Who's Who in America, 1984–1985
 http://ssdi.rootsweb.com/cgi-bin/ssdi.cgi

External links
 Virginia Smith papers at the University of Nebraska-Lincoln

1911 births
2006 deaths
People from Fremont County, Iowa
People from Deuel County, Nebraska
University of Nebraska–Lincoln alumni
Female members of the United States House of Representatives
Women in Nebraska politics
People from Sun City, Arizona
Arizona Republicans
Republican Party members of the United States House of Representatives from Nebraska
20th-century American politicians
20th-century American women politicians
21st-century American women